The 2023 World Lacrosse Championship will be the 14th edition of the international men's field lacrosse tournament for national teams organized by World Lacrosse. Initially scheduled for 2022, it was postponed to 2023 due to the COVID-19 pandemic. The tournament will be held in San Diego, California.

The tournament will be limited to 30 teams for the first time through regional qualifying tournaments.

Hosting
The Federation of International Lacrosse (FIL), since renamed World Lacrosse, gave its member associations until the end of September 2016 to formally make its intent to bid known to the international sports body and March 2017 to submit their bid. The winning bid was announced in June 2018.

On June 25, 2018, FIL President Sue Redfern announced that Canada will host the 2022 World Lacrosse Championship in Coquitlam, British Columbia. According to the bidding team of the Canadian Lacrosse Association, it chose Coquitlam as the proposed host city for its bid citing the locality's previous hosting experience of the 2008 and 2016 men's U-19 world championships. On 18 October 2019, the organizing committee withdrew its bid to host the event in Coquitlam. Matches were to be held at the Percy Perry Stadium from July 14–23, 2022.

In October 2019, after the withdrawal of the organization, the championship was moved to California with the aim for better promoting lacrosse for a return to the Summer Olympics. In June 2020, the championship was postponed by a year due to the COVID-19 pandemic with Los Angeles named as host city.

In January 2022, the championship was relocated another time, as San Diego was announced as the new host city for 2023. The main venue will be Snapdragon Stadium at San Diego State University, with matches also taking place at Torero Stadium at the University of San Diego and three other fields at San Diego State.

Participating nations
The 2023 World Lacrosse Championship is the first World Lacrosse Championship to set a maximum number of competing teams, capping invitations at 30 national teams. Previous world championship rankings determined automatic qualifiers for 2023 and the number of remaining spots allocated to each Continental Federation. The top 10 full member nations at the conclusion of the 2018 world championship automatically qualified for 2023 with regional qualifiers necessary for remaining teams in the European Lacrosse Federation (11 spots), Pan-American Lacrosse Association (4 spots), Asia Pacific Lacrosse Union (4 spots), and the African Association of Lacrosse (1 spot).

Finland initially qualified through the European qualifiers, however they withdrew due to funding challenges and were replaced by France, who was the next highest ranked European team.

Qualifying National Teams

Participated in 2018 but not in 2023

'* Finland replaced by France after an announcement that they will be unable to travel to the 2023 tournament

References

External links
 World Lacrosse

2023
World Lacrosse Championship
Lacrosse World Championship 2023
Sports competitions in San Diego
World Lacrosse
World Lacrosse